Wyoming Highway 310 (WYO 310) is a  Wyoming State Road located in central Platte County.

Route description
Wyoming Highway 310 begins its western end (southern at this point) at Reservoir Road on the edge of the Wheatland Reservoir #1, southwest of Wheatland. WYO 310 travels due north, named Hightower Road, for approximately 4 miles until it intersects the southern terminus of Wyoming Highway 311 (N. Hightower Road) near the CDP of Westview Circle. Here WYO 310 turns east toward Wheatland and travels now due east for almost 4 miles before reaching 16th Street, the former routing of US 87 through Wheatland, where it turns south onto 16th Street. Highway 310 travels south for a short distance of only 0.33 miles and ends at an intersection with I-25 Business/US 87 Business and the northern terminus of Wyoming Highway 312.

History
The length of Highway 310 between its southern terminus and Oak Street in Wheatland was the former routing of US Route 87 prior to its relocation onto Interstate 25. Prior to this, WYO 310 used to end at the intersection of Oak Street and 16th Street (Old US 87), but was later extended south another third of a miles to its current terminus.

Major intersections

References

External links 

Wyoming State Routes 300-399
Wyoming Highway 310 - WYO 311 to Reservoir Road
Wyoming Highway 310 - I-25 Bus/US-87 Bus/WYO 312 to WYO 311

Transportation in Platte County, Wyoming
311